Nazyvayevsk (Nazyvaı) is a town in Omsk Oblast, Russia, located  west of Omsk, the administrative center of the oblast. As of the 2010 Census, its population was 11,615.

It was previously known as Sibirsky Posad (until 1917), Sibirskoye (until 1933), Nazyvayevka (until 1947), Novonazyvayevsk (until 1956).

Administrative and municipal status
Within the framework of administrative divisions, Nazyvayevsk serves as the administrative center of Nazyvayevsky District, even though it is not a part of it. As an administrative division, it is incorporated separately as the town of oblast significance of Nazyvayevsk—an administrative unit with the status equal to that of the districts. As a municipal division, the town of oblast significance of Nazyvayevsk is incorporated within Nazyvayevsky Municipal District as Nazyvayevsk Urban Settlement.

Transportation

The town is a transfer point on the northern branch of the Trans-Siberian Railway between the Western Siberian and Sverdlovsk railways.

References

Notes

Sources

Cities and towns in Omsk Oblast